Daphne Sounds Expensive is a BBC Radio 4 comedy series, written and performed by the sketch comedy trio 'Daphne' (Jason Forbes, Phil Wang and George Fouracres).

Daphne Sounds Expensive was shortlisted for the 'Best Radio Sketch Show' award at the Comedy.co.uk Awards 2016. Radio 4 commissioned a second series which it would broadcast from 13 July 2017.

Background
Jason Forbes, Phil Wang and George Fouracres came together to form the sketch group Daphne in 2014. Daphne went on to win the London Sketchfest's prize for 'Best New Act' in 2015. Their debut Edinburgh Festival Fringe show, Daphne Do Edinburgh, was critically acclaimed and the group was nominated for the 2015 Foster's (formerly Perrier) Award.

In February 2016, the BBC announced that Daphne would be bringing a "Goon Show-esque" comedy to BBC Radio 4.

The show was recorded in front of a live audience at BBC Broadcasting House.

Overview
In addition to Daphne (Jason Forbes, Phil Wang and George Fouracres), the cast of Daphne Sounds Expensive includes guest stars such as: opera singer Sir Willard White – a series regular; actors Elizabeth Tan and Lewis MacLeod; and author Caitlin Moran.

It also features original music composed by Jeff Carpenter and Pippa Cleary, and a live nine-piece band from the London Musical Theatre Orchestra.

The show's producer, Matt Stronge, is the grandson of Goon Show writer and comedian Eric Sykes.

List of episodes

Series 1

Series 2

References

BBC Radio 4 programmes
British radio sketch shows
2016 radio programme debuts